Viñales is a town and municipality in the north-central Pinar del Río Province of Cuba. The town consists mostly of one-story wooden houses with porches. The municipality is dominated by low mountain ranges of the Cordillera de Guaniguanico such as Sierra de los Órganos. Typical outcrops known as mogotes complete the karstic character of the landscape.

The town and the Viñales Valley immediately to the north were made a UNESCO World Heritage Site in November 1999 for the karst landscape and traditional agriculture as well as vernacular architecture, crafts and music.

History

Before European settlement, the area was the home of a remnant Taíno population swelled with runaway slaves. The area was colonised at the beginning of the 1800s by tobacco growers from the Canary Islands, who settled in the Vuelta Abajo region. The first colonial settlement in Viñales is documented in 1871, in the form of a ranch belonging to Andrés Hernández Ramos. The town was established in 1878 as a typical community, with church, school, hospital and recreation park.

Economy

Viñales is an agricultural area, where crops of fruit, vegetables, coffee and especially tobacco are grown by traditional methods. Fishing is also an important part of the area's economy.

Tourism
Tourism centered on the Viñales Valley is developing, the area being protected by constitution since February 1976, and declared a national monument in October 1978. 

Attractions in Viñales include the Viñales Municipal Museum, Casa de Caridad Botanical Gardens, Museo Paleontológico, Palenque (a Maroon village) and the nearby caves (Cueva del Indio, Cueva de José Miguel, Cueva de Santo Tomás) in Valle de Viñales National Park, which were refuges for runaway slaves.  There is also a cave that doubles as a nightclub.

Casas particulares (private residences that have been tailored and licensed to operate as bed and breakfasts) offer accommodations to visitors year-round. There are also three hotels located a few kilometers outside of town, rated three stars: La Ermita, Los Jazmines, and Rancho Horizontes San Vicente. The campground Dos Hermanas has 54 cabins available to tourists, a swimming pool and a restaurant.

Climate
Viñales has a tropical monsoon climate according to the Köppen climate classification, with a hot, lengthy wet season, and a warm and relatively short dry season. The average temperatures range from highs of 31.7 °C and lows of 22 °C in July and August to 26.2 °C and 16.1 °C in February. April–November represents the wet season, being especially wet May–October. December–March is the dry season, however only December and March qualify as true dry season months, as the threshold for such a month is less than 60 millimeters. The rainiest month in Viñales is June, with 226 millimeters, and the driest is December with 50 millimeters.

Demographics
In 2004, the municipality of Viñales had a population of 27,129 with a 0.69%/year increase.

Gallery

See also

Municipalities of Cuba
List of cities in Cuba

References

External links

Viñales Municipality 
"Valle Son Music" A collection of son and salsa groups performing in Viñales
"Viñales Tours & Accommodation" Tourist information on the town of Viñales
"Viñales, Land to Dream" Viñales Page Information
Viñales information about Casas Particulares Viñales Page about tourism Information and Casas Particulares

Populated places in Pinar del Río Province
Populated places established in 1871
Climbing areas of Cuba
1871 establishments in the Spanish Empire